Ronald Kinsey Milleson was a former member of the Ohio Senate, representing the 30th District from 1975 to 1980.  He was preceded by Doug Applegate.  His son, Richard Milleson, is a Regional Director for the Ohio Department of Natural Resources.

References

Democratic Party Ohio state senators
Living people
Year of birth missing (living people)